The Dusty Foot on the Road is a live album by Somali-Canadian rapper K'naan, released June 25, 2007 on Wrasse Records.

Track listing

References

K'naan albums
2007 live albums
Wrasse Records live albums